Nanda lake is a Ramsar site located on the Indian state of Goa. It covers an area of 0.42 square kilometres. It is situated in Curchorem. It is the first and only Ramsar wetland site in Goa.

History 
The lake was notified as a wetland by the Indian government on 2021 under the Wetland (Conservation and Management) Rules, 2017. On 6 August 2022, it was declared as a Ramsar wetland site on 2022 Ramsar Convention .

Fauna 
The wetland is home to red-wattled lapwing, black-headed ibis, bronze-winged jacana, brahminy kite, common kingfisher, wire-tailed swallow, intermediate egret, little cormorant and lesser whistling duck.

(Acridotheres  fuscus), 
(Acrocephalus  stentoreus), 
(Actitis hypoleucos), 
(Aegithina tiphia), 
(Alcedo atthis), 
(Ardea purpurea), 
(Ardeotis nigriceps), 
(Brachythemis  contaminata), 
(Bradinopyga geminata), 
(Brumoides suturalis), 
(Bubalus bubalis), 
(Camponotus compressus), 
(Castalius rosimon), 
(Centropus sinensis), 
(Ceriagrion  cerinorubellum), 
(Chilocorus nigritus), 
(Coccinella  transversalis), 
(Crocothemis servilia), 
(Danaus genutia), 
(Delias eucharis), 
(Dendrocygna javanica), 
(Dicaeum concolor), 
(Dicrurus macrocercus), 
(Dinopium benghalense), 
(Dolichopus nigricornis), 
(Drosophila  melanogaster), 
(Egretta garzetta), 
(Egretta intermedia), 
(Euchrysops cnejus), 
(Eudynamys scolopaceus), 
(Euploea core), 
(Eurema hecabe), 
(Freyeria putli), 
(Gallinago gallinago), 
(Glareola lactea), 
(Gryllodes sigillatus), 
(Halcyon smyrnensis), 
(Haliastur indus), 
(Hirundo rustica), 
(Hirundo smithii), 
(Idea jasonia), 
(Ixobrychus cinnamomeus), 
(Junonia almana), 
(Junonia atlites), 
(Lasius niger), 
(Lepidocephalichthys  thermalis), 
(Lepisma saccharina), 
(Leptocoma zeylonica), 
(Leptoptilos javanicu), 
(Leptosia nina), 
(Libellula needhami), 
(Lonchura malacca), 
(Lutrogale  perspicillata), 
(Megalaima viridis), 
(Melanitis leda), 
(Merops orientalis), 
(Merops philippinus), 
(Metopidius indicus), 
(Microcarbo niger), 
(Micronia aculeata), 
(Milvus migrans), 
(Motacilla flava), 
(Motacilla  maderaspatensis), 
(Neptis hylas), 
(Nettapus  coromandelianus), 
(Neurothemis fulvia), 
(Neurothemis tullia), 
(Nycticorax nycticorax), 
(Oecophylla smaragdina), 
(Oriolus kundoo), 
(Orphulella pelidna), 
(Orthotomus sutorius), 
(Oxyopes shweta), 
(Paratrechina  longicornis), 
(Pardaleodes edipus), 
(Peucetia viridans), 
(Phalacrocorax  fuscicollis), 
(Phylloscopus  trochiloides), 
(Plegadis falcinellus), 
(Ploceus manyar), 
(Pluvialis fulva), 
(Polyrhachis dives), 
(Porphyrio porphyrio  poliocephalus), 
(Prinia socialis), 
(Prinia sylvatica), 
(Pseudagrion  microcephalum), 
(Pseudibis papillosa), 
(Pycnonotus cafer), 
(Pycnonotus jocosus), 
(Pycnonotus luteolus), 
(Rhipidura albogularis), 
(Rhyothemis variegata), 
(Sarangesa dasahara), 
(Saxicoloides fulicatus), 
(Spialia galba), 
(Spilopelia chinensis), 
(Sterna aurantia), 
(Tanaecia lepidea), 
(Taractrocera maevius), 
(Tetraponera rufonigra), 
(Threskiornis  melanocephalus), 
(Vanellus indicus), 
(Ypthima huebneri),

References

External links

Ramsar sites in India
Protected areas of Goa
Geography of South Goa district